Geyer is a town in Saxony, Germany.

Geyer may also refer to:

 Geyer (surname)
 Geyer, Indonesia, a subdistrict in Grobogan Regency, Central Java, Indonesia
 8th SS Cavalry Division Florian Geyer, a Waffen-SS cavalry Division during World War II
 Geyer Act, an act of the Missouri State Legislature
 Geyer Bank, a salt dome bank in the Gulf of Mexico
 Geyer Willow, a species of willow
 Geyer's sedge, a species of sedge
 Geyer's whorl snail, a species of snail

See also 
 Gayer (surname)
 Geier (disambiguation)
 Geijer